Camarón may refer to:

 Cape Camarón, a cape on the Caribbean coast of Honduras
 Battle of Camarón, an 1863 battle, part of the French intervention in Mexico
"Camarón", a song by Paco de lucía from Luzia, 1998

People with the given name
 Camaron Cheeseman (born 1998), American football player
 Camarón de la Isla (1950–1992), Spanish flamenco singer

Food 
Camarón various Mexican and South American dishes with shrimp. See List of Mexican dishes, Chilean cuisine

See also

 Camarón de Tejeda, a town in the Mexican state of Veracruz
 Camaron rebosado, a Philippine dish with deep-fried battered shrimp
 
 
 Cameroon (disambiguation)
 Cameron (disambiguation)